Eric A. Darken is an American percussionist, composer, and programmer.

Biography 
Drawing inspiration from his grandfather, a band leader. Darken began playing drums at age 12, and played timpani and mallets in high school. Darken attended Brevard College in Brevard, North Carolina, then transferred to Oral Roberts University in Tulsa, Oklahoma. Darken was also a part of the ORTV Richard Roberts television show.

Darken has participated in recording sessions for Bon Jovi, Jewel, Luke Bryan, Darius Rucker, Carrie Underwood, and Taylor Swift.

Darken has toured in support of Vince Gill, Amy Grant, Faith Hill, Take 6, and Bob Seger. Darken currently tours with Jimmy Buffett and The Coral Reefer Band.

Darken has written underscores for TV shows, including Dateline NBC, 20/20, Fox Sports, Discovery Channel, NFL Network, and National Geographic, and for the film, Fantastic Four: Rise of the Silver Surfer.

Darken created percussion samples and loops for various digital collections, including the Organic Percussion library of samples, loops, and presets, and the Eric Darken collection for Discrete Drums.

In 2008, Darken won an Academy of Country Music award for Musician of the Year in the "Specialty Instrument" category.

Darken won the Gospel Music Association Dove Award for Instrumental Album Of The Year in 1996.

Darken's first solo album, A Drummer Boy's Christmas, was a jazz Christmas album released in 1993. It was reviewed positively by the Chicago Tribune, whose Nancy Stetson said that it "shows the genre at its best" and "there is nothing cute or gimmicky". Cashbox magazine also reviewed the album with favor, stating that it "is sure to be a favorite in living rooms and store stereos alike with classic- yet-pop-inflected interpretations of your favorites. There's even a few new tunes to make this album worth a second look."

Discography

Solo albums
 1993: A Drummer Boy's Christmas (Warner Alliance)
 1995: Cappuccino Afternoon (Unison)
 1995: Rhythm of the Night (Unison) compilation
 1999: Through the Highlands (Unison)

With The Players
 1996: The Players (Warner Alliance)

Also appears on

1991–1999
 1991: Wes King - Sticks & Stones (Reunion)
 1992: 4Him - The Basics of Life (Benson Records)
 1993: Alan Jackson - Honky Tonk Christmas (Arista)
 1993: Steve Taylor - Squint (Warner Alliance)
 1994: Amy Grant - House of Love (A&M)
 1994: 4Him - The Ride (Benson)
 1994: Idle Cure - Eclipse (Salt)
 1995: Whiteheart - Inside (Curb)
 1996: Barry Manilow - Summer of '78 (Arista)
 1996: Sarah Masen - Sarah Masen (re:think)
 1996: Charlie Peacock - Strangelanguage (re:think)
 1996: Steven Curtis Chapman - Signs of Life (Sparrow Records)
 1996: 4Him - The Message (Benson)
 1997: Switchfoot - The Legend of Chin (re:think)
 1998: Van Zant - Brother to Brother (CMC International)
 1998: CeCe Winans - Everlasting Love (Pioneer)
 1998: Michael W. Smith - Christmastime (Reunion Records)
 1999: John Elefante - Defying Gravity (Pamplin)
 1999: Crystal Gayle - Crystal Gayle Sings the Heart and Soul of Hoagy Carmichael (Platinum Entertainment)
 1999: Faith Hill - Breathe (Warner Bros.)
 1999: Lonestar - Lonely Grill (BNA)
 1999: Martina McBride - White Christmas (RCA)
 1999: Charlie Peacock - Kingdom Come (re:think)
 1999: Martin Taylor - Kiss and Tell (Columbia)
 1999: Carman - Passion for Praise (Sparrow)
 1999: Steven Curtis Chapman - Speechless (Sparrow)
 1999:  Michael W. Smith - This Is Your Time (Reunion)

2000–2002
 2000: Chad Brock - Yes! (Warner Bros.)
 2000: Billy Ray Cyrus - Southern Rain (Monument)
 2000: John Wesley Harding - The Confessions Of St. Ace (Mammoth)
 2000: Richard Marx - Days in Avalon (Signal 21)
 2000: Allison Moorer - The Hardest Part (MCA Nashville)
 2000: Wynonna Judd - New Day Dawning (Mercury / Curb)
 2000: Terry Radigan - Radigan (Vanguard)
 2000: Michael W. Smith - Freedom (Reunion)
 2000: Lee Ann Womack - I Hope You Dance (MCA Nashville)
 2000: 4Him - Hymns: A Place of Worship (Benson)
 2001: Brooks & Dunn - Steers & Stripes (Arista Nashville)
 2001: Peter Cetera - Another Perfect World (Victor)
 2001: Billy Gilman - Dare to Dream (Epic)
 2001: Jewel - This Way (Atlantic)
 2001: Hal Ketchum - Lucky Man (Curb)
 2001: SHeDAISY - The Whole SHeBANG (Lyric Street)
 2001: Steven Curtis Chapman - Declaration (Sparrow)
 2002: ...And You Will Know Us by the Trail of Dead - Source Tags & Codes (Interscope)
 2002: Art Garfunkel with Maia Sharp and Buddy Mondlock - Everything Waits to be Noticed (Manhattan)
 2002: Amy Grant Legacy... Hymns and Faith (Word)
 2002: Faith Hill - Cry (Warner Bros.)
 2002: Montgomery Gentry - My Town (Columbia)
 2002: Joe Nichols - Man with a Memory (Universal South)
 2002: Beth Nielsen Chapman - Deeper Still (Artemis)
 2002: Michelle Williams - Heart to Yours (Columbia)

2003–2004
 2003: Gary Allan - See If I Care (MCA Nashville)
 2003: Larry Carlton - Sapphire Blue (Bluebird)
 2003: Vince Gill - Next Big Thing (MCA Nashville)
 2003: Los Lonely Boys - Los Lonely Boys (Or Music / Epic)
 2003: Lynyrd Skynyrd - Vicious Cycle (Sanctuary)
 2003: Cerys Matthews - Cockahoop (Blanco Y Negro)
 2003: Stacie Orrico - Stacie Orrico (Virgin)
 2003: Brad Paisley - Mud on the Tires (Arista Nashville)
 2003: Josh Turner - Long Black Train (MCA Nashville)
 2003: 4Him - Visible (Word /Curb/ Warner Bros.)
 2004: Jimmy Buffett - License to Chill (Mailboat)
 2004: Melonie Cannon - Melonie Cannon (Skaggs Family)
 2004: Mary Chapin Carpenter - Between Here and Gone (Columbia)
 2004: Peter Cetera - You Just Gotta Love Christmas (Viastar)
 2004: Richard Marx - My Own Best Enemy (Manhattan)
 2004: Megadeth - The System Has Failed (Sanctuary)
 2004: Montgomery Gentry - You Do Your Thing (Columbia)
 2004: Bebo Norman - Try (Essential)
 2004: Laura Turner - Soul Deep (Curb)
 2004: Phil Vassar - Shaken Not Stirred (Arista Nashville)
 2004: Gretchen Wilson - Here for the Party (Epic)

2005–2006
 2005: Trace Adkins - Songs About Me (Capitol Nashville)
 2005: Brooks & Dunn - Hillbilly Deluxe (Arista Nashville)
 2005: Ashley Cleveland - Men and Angels Say (Rambler)
 2005: Faith Hill - Fireflies (Warner Bros.)
 2005: Miranda Lambert - Kerosene (Epic)
 2005: Brad Paisley - Time Well Wasted (Arista Nashville)
 2005: Randy Travis - Glory Train: Songs of Faith, Worship, and Praise (Curb / Warner Bros.)
 2005: Carrie Underwood - Some Hearts (Arista Nashville)
 2005: Keith Urban - Be Here (Capitol Nashville)
 2005: Van Zant - Get Right with the Man (Columbia)
 2006: Trace Adkins - Dangerous Man (Capitol Nashville)
 2006: Carolina Rain - Weather the Storm (Equity)
 2006: Matt Dusk - Back in Town (Decca)
 2006: Jace Everett - Jace Everett (Epic)
 2006: Vince Gill - These Days (MCA Nashville)
 2006: Steve Holy - Brand New Girlfriend (Curb)
 2006: Cerys Matthews - Never Said Goodbye (Rough Trade)
 2006: Rascal Flatts - Me and My Gang (Lyric Street)
 2006: Kenny Rogers - Water & Bridges (EMI / Capitol)
 2006: Bob Seger - Face the Promise (Capitol)
 2006: Taylor Swift - Taylor Swift (Big Machine)
 2006: Josh Turner - Your Man (MCA Nashville)
 2006: Keith Urban - Love, Pain & the Whole Crazy Thing (Capitol Nashville)

2007–2009
 2007: Trace Adkins - Dangerous Man (Capitol Nashville)
 2007: Bon Jovi - Lost Highway (Island / Mercury)
 2007: Brooks & Dunn - Cowboy Town (Arista Nashville)
 2007: Kenny Chesney - Just Who I Am: Poets & Pirates (BNA)
 2007: Toby Keith - Big Dog Daddy (Show Dog Nashville)
 2007: Miranda Lambert - Crazy Ex-Girlfriend (Sony BMG)
 2007: Alan Morse - Four O' Clock and Hysteria (Dingwall)
 2007: Joe Nichols - Real Things (Universal South)
 2007: LeAnn Rimes - Family (Curb)
 2007: Josh Turner - Everything Is Fine (MCA Nashville)
 2007: Carrie Underwood - Carnival Ride (Arista Nashville)
 2007: Van Zant - My Kind of Country (Sony BMG)
 2007: Gretchen Wilson - One of the Boys (Sony BMG Nashville)
 2007: Trisha Yearwood - Heaven, Heartache and the Power of Love (Big Machine)
 2007: Steven Curtis Chapman - This Moment (Sparrow)
 2008: Trace Atkins - X (Capitol Nashville)
 2008: Chris Cagle - My Life's Been a Country Song (Capitol Nashville)
 2008: Julianne Hough - Julianne Hough (Mercury)
 2008: Jewel - Perfectly Clear (Valory)
 2008: Willie Nelson - Moment of Forever (Lost Highway)
 2008: Brad Paisley - Play: The Guitar Album (Arista Nashville)
 2008: Kellie Pickler - Kellie Pickler (Sony BMG)
 2008: Toby Keith - That Don't Make Me a Bad Guy (Show Dog Nashville)
 2008: Darius Rucker - Learn to Live (Capitol Nashville)
 2008: Taylor Swift - Fearless (Big Machine)
 2009: Toby Keith - American Ride (Show Dog Nashville)
 2009: Martina McBride - Shine (RCA / Sony)
 2009: David Nail - I'm About to Come Alive (MCA Nashville)
 2009: Jordin Sparks - Battlefield (Sony Music)
 2009: Taylor Swift - The Taylor Swift Holiday Collection (Big Machine)
 2009: Carrie Underwood - Play On (Arista Nashville)
 2009: Hank Williams Jr. - 127 Rose Avenue (Curb)
 2009: Vanessa Williams - The Real Thing (Concord)

2010–2012
 2010: Lady Antebellum - Lady Antebellum (Capitol)
 2010: Peter Frampton - Thank You Mr. Churchill (A&M)
 2010: Jewel - Sweet and Wild (Valory)
 2010: Jamey Johnson - The Guitar Song (Mercury)
 2010: Toby Keith - Bullets in the Gun (Show Dog Universal)
 2010: Lonestar - Party Heard Around the World (Saguaro Road)
 2010: Cliff Richard - Bold as Brass (EMI)
 2010: Taylor Swift - Speak Now (Big Machine)
 2010: Josh Turner - Haywire (MCA Nashville)
 2011: Trace Adkins - Proud to Be Here (Show Dog Nashville)
 2011: Luke Bryan - Tailgates & Tanlines (Capitol Nashville)
 2011: Sara Evans - Stronger (Sony / RCA)
 2011: Toby Keith - Clancy's Tavern (Hump Head)
 2011: Diane Schuur - The Gathering (Vanguard)
 2012: Dierks Bentley - Home (Capitol Nashville)
 2012: Toby Keith - Hope on the Rocks (Show Dog-Universal)
 2012: Kenny Rogers - Faith (Hump Head)
 2012: Taylor Swift - Red (Big Machine)
 2012: Josh Turner - Punching Bag (MCA Nashville)
 2012: Carrie Underwood - Blown Away (Arista Nashville)

2013–2014
 2013: Trace Adkins - Love Will... (Show Dog Universal)
 2013: Jimmy Buffett - Songs from St. Somewhere (Mailboat)
 2013: Kenny Chesney - Life on a Rock (Columbia Nashville)
 2013: Sheryl Crow - Feels Like Home (Warner Bros.)
 2013: Deep Purple - Now What?! (Eagle)
 2013: John Fogerty - Wrote a Song for Everyone (Vanguard)
 2013: Toby Keith - Drinks After Work (Show Dog Universal)
 2013: Ashley Monroe - Like a Rose (Warner Bros. Nashville)
 2013: Cassadee Pope - Frame by Frame (Republic Nashville)
 2013: Kenny Rogers - You Can't Make Old Friends (Warner Bros.)
 2013: Darius Rucker - True Believers (Capitol Nashville)
 2013: George Strait - Love is Everything (MCA Nashville)
 2014: Gary Allan - Set You Free (MCA Nashville)
 2014: Dan + Shay - Where It All Began (Warner Bros.)
 2014: Sara Evans - Slow Me Down (RCA)
 2014: Peter Frampton - Hummingbird in a Box: Songs for a Ballet (Phenix Phonograph)
 2014: Lucy Hale - Road Between (DMG Nashville)
 2014: Neal Morse - Songs from November (Radiant / Metal Blade)
 2014: Jerrod Niemann - High Noon (Arista Nashville)
 2014: Dolly Parton - Blue Smoke (Dolly)
 2014: Rascal Flatts - Rewind (Big Machine)

2015–present
 2015: James Bay - Chaos and the Calm (Republic Records)
 2015: Clint Black - On Purpose (Blacktop)
 2015: Hunter Hayes - I Want Crazy (Atlantic)
 2015: Maddie & Tae - Start Here (Dot)
 2015: Ashley Monroe - The Blade (Warner Nashville)
 2015: Darius Rucker - Southern Style (Capitol Nashville)
 2015: Carrie Underwood - Storyteller (Arista Nashville)
 2016: Vince Gill - Down to My Last Bad Habit (MCA Nashville)
 2016: Kaleo - A/B (Atlantic / Elektra)
 2016: Lonestar - Never Enders (Shanachie)
 2016: Megadeth - Dystopia (Tradecraft / Universal)
 2016: Maren Morris - Hero (Columbia Nashville)
 2016: Neal Morse Band - The Similitude of a Dream (Radiant / Metal Blade)
 2016: Mo Pitney - Behind This Guitar (Curb)
 2017: Niall Horan - Flicker (Capitol)
 2017: Toby Keith - The Bus Songs (Show Dog Nashville)
 2017: Mac McAnally - Southbound: The Orchestra Project (Mailboat)
 2017: Jerrod Niemann - This Ride (Curb)
 2017: Carly Pearce - Every Little Thing (Big Machine)
 2017: Josh Turner - Deep South (MCA Nashville)
 2017: Shania Twain - Now'' (Mercury Nashville)

References

External links 
 
 
 
 

Living people
American rock drummers
American session musicians
20th-century American drummers
American male drummers
21st-century American drummers
Coral Reefer Band members
20th-century American male musicians
21st-century American male musicians
Year of birth missing (living people)